Junri Namigata was the defending champion but chose not to participate.

Hsieh Su-wei won the title, defeating Kurumi Nara 6–2, 6–2 in the final.

Seeds

Main draw

Finals

Top half

Bottom half

References
 Main Draw
 Qualifying Draw

Beijing International Challenger - Singles
2010 Women's Singles